Peita-Claire Hepperlin (born 24 December 1981) was an Australian former football midfielder who played for the Australia women's national soccer team.

She participated at the 2000 Summer Olympics and the 1999 FIFA Women's World Cup.

See also
 Australia at the 2000 Summer Olympics

References

External links
 
 
 http://www.soccerpunter.com/players/292048-Peita-Claire-Hepperlin
 http://www.houstondynamo.com/post/2016/07/26/perfect-espresso-and-more-ellie-brush

1981 births
Living people
Australian women's soccer players
Place of birth missing (living people)
Footballers at the 2000 Summer Olympics
Olympic soccer players of Australia
Women's association football midfielders
1999 FIFA Women's World Cup players
Australia women's international soccer players
ACT Academy of Sport alumni